Viola Credit (formerly known as Plenus) is an Israeli-based global alternative credit investment manager, providing customized credit to technology companies & Fintech lenders.

Providing two main offerings: Growth Lending & Fintech Lending.

Since 2000, Viola Credit has successfully completed over 150 transactions and currently manages over $1B in various businesses across multiple stages and geographies.

Viola Credit is based in Herzeliya, Israel.

History 
Viola Credit was founded in 2000 by the Viola Group, Ruthi Simha and Moti Weiss, and is now managed by the partners Ruthi Simha, Ido Vigdor and Alex Ginzburg.

Viola Credit is a part of the Viola Group (Hebrew: קבוצת ויולה‎, alt: Hebrew: קרן ויולה‎), established in 2000, is an Israeli private equity investment group with over $4 billion under management.

Funds Raised 

Privately held companies of Israel
Israeli companies established in 2000
Financial services companies established in 2000